The Serie B 1993–94 was the sixty-second tournament of this competition played in Italy since its creation.

Teams
Ravenna, Vicenza, Palermo and Acireale had been promoted from Serie C, while Brescia, Fiorentina, Ancona and Pescara had been relegated from Serie A.

Final classification

Results

Tie-breakers

Promotion tie-breaker

Padova promoted to Serie A.

Relegation tie-breaker
Played in Salerno on June 14

Pisa relegated and later went bankrupt.

Serie B seasons
2
Italy